The 2010 ICF Canoe Slalom World Championships were held 8–12 September 2010 at Tacen Whitewater Course, Slovenia under the auspices of International Canoe Federation for the record-tying third time. It was the 33rd edition. Tacen hosted the event previously in 1955 and 1991 when it was part of Yugoslavia, and joins the following cities that have hosted the event three times: Spittal, Austria (1963, 1965, and 1977); Meran, Italy (1953, 1971, and 1983); Bourg St.-Maurice, France (1969, 1987, and 2002); and Augsburg, Germany (1957, 1985, and 2003). Women's single canoe (C1W) events became a medal event after being an exhibition in the previous championships.

Ten nations won medals at the championships, the most since the 2005 championships in Penrith. Slovakia was the big winner with five medals including three golds and two silvers. Men's canoe top medalists were Slovak Michal Martikán and France's Denis Gargaud Chanut and Fabien Lefèvre, each with two medals (one gold and one silver). Lefèvre became the first canoeist to medal in both canoe and kayak disciplines at the same championship while Jana Dukátová of Slovakia became the first woman to win gold in the C1 event and the first woman to medal in both canoe and kayak disciplines at the same championship. Dukátová won silver in the K1 women's event the day before. Italy's Daniele Molmenti won two medals in men's kayak with gold in K1 and bronze in K1 team.

Weather conditions forced schedule changes when flow from the River Sava increased water flow fivefold, resulting in course damage that delayed competition for nearly a day on 9 September.

Event's corporate images

Event logo
The logo comprised elements connected to the sport and the event's organization. Main motif of two paddles that made up the letter X, which was the Roman numeral for 10 which is for 2010. It also is for the Roman Empire settlement of Emona, located in present-day Ljubljana, located near Tacen. The paddles in the middle of the boat are not connected deliberately to communicate both canoeing and kayaking.

Main motif is framed by a crest which comprises two lines. The bottom line is a copy of the boat in the transverse section while the top line is a copy of the boat in the vertical section. The crest carries a sense of nobility and that the sport in the past was connected with both townspeople and aristocrats along with environmental protection. Waves shown flanking the crest link the event's organizer with the ICF.

Short name
SLOKA has two names: SLalOm KAyak and Canoe Championships or SLOvene KAyak and canoe. It is acceptable in foreign languages that does not contain any special Slovene characters.

Slogan
The slogan Wild water, pure joy (Divja voda, čisti užitek is ) describes the essence of conquering the rapids refers to wild water and pleasure simultaneously. This slogan is in green and blue that combines water pleasures and ecology.

Mascot
The crawfish is a symbol of clean water and life in and around that water. It is also an independent and distinctive character to enhance the story of motion and vivacity that also evokes positive motions.

Schedule
This was the schedule listed as of 15 August 2010. All times listed are CEST (UTC+2).

K1 heats for 9 September were postponed due to the River Sava water flows exceeding / sec. K1 heats were moved to 10 September at 14:30. Two days earlier, the schedule was also revised for all individual events to flow along the river rising from a level of / sec.

A revised schedule was issued on 10 September. The C1W team event was canceled as a result of the schedule change.

Medal summary

Men's

Canoe

Kayak

Women's

Canoe

Kayak

Medal table

References

 2009–2011 ICF schedule. – accessed 16 July 2009.
 International Canoe Federation

External links
 Official website 

Canoe Slalom World Championships
World Canoe Slalom Championships
ICF Canoe Slalom World Championships
International sports competitions hosted by Slovenia
Canoeing in Slovenia
September 2010 sports events in Europe